Vaddangi is a village in Srikakulam District in Andhra Pradesh, India. It is located near Kotturu town. In the 2011 census it had a population of 1206 and 274 households.

The nearest railway station is Srikakulam Road (Amadalavalasa). The nearest airport is Visakhapatnam. It is on a bus route from Srikakulam to Battili, 3 km away from Gurandi.

References

Villages in Srikakulam district